The Association of Sound Designers, also known as the ASD, is a British charity representing a large proportion of the British theatrical sound engineering community.

Formation
In December 2009, Gregg Fisher organised a series of meetings with a small group of sound designers to start discussing the formation of an association for sound designers. This group of sound designers formed a steering committee and began discussing what such an organisation should do and how it might exist. The steering committee consisted of: Gareth Fry, Gareth Owen, Paul Arditti, Ian Dickinson, Carolyn Downing, John Leonard, Nela Brown, Steven Brown, Gregg Fisher, David McSeveney, and Christopher Shutt. From this steering committee, the Association of Sound Designers was born, helmed by chairman Gareth Fry.

Activity 
The association is currently active in supporting the mental health of its members, as well as helping the theatre industry reboot itself after the Covid pandemic. They are involved in the Sunday Times National Student Drama Festival as a supporter of the Outstanding Contribution to the Technical Team Award. The ASD also provide extensive resources to support new and upcoming sound designers, as well as working hard for inclusivity in the theatre industry. In 2014 they were active in pressurising the American Tony committee to reinstate the Tony Award for Sound Design.

References

External links 
Association of Sound Designers

Professional associations based in the United Kingdom
Sound production